Krotoszyce is a village in Legnica County, Lower Silesian Voivodeship, in south-western Poland. It is the seat of the administrative district (gmina) called Gmina Krotoszyce.

References

Villages in Legnica County